Right Reverend Joseph Ponniah (born 12 October 1952) is a Sri Lanka Tamil priest and the current Roman Catholic Bishop of Batticaloa.

Early life
Ponniah was born on 12 October 1952 in Thannamunai in eastern Ceylon. He was educated at St. Joseph's Minor Seminary and St. Joseph's College, Trincomalee. He has Bachelor of Philosophy degree from St. Paul Seminary, Thiruchirapally and a Bachelor of Theology from the National Seminary, Poonah. Ponniah also has a Bachelor of Arts degree from the University of Peradeniya, a Licentiate in Biblical Theology degree from the Pontifical Urbaniana University (1993) and a Doctor of Philosophy in Christian civilization from the University of Jaffna.

Career
Ponniah was ordained as a priest in April 1980. He was parish priest at St. Mary's Co-Cathedral, Batticaloa (1980–82), Vaharai, Veechchu Kalmunai and Ayhiyamalai. He was rector at the Minor Seminar, Batticaloa (1993–96) before teaching Pauline theology as professor of holy scriptures at the National Seminary, Ampitiya (1996-01). He was then parish priest in Thandavanveli (2001–06) and vicar general for the Diocese of Trincomalee-Batticaloa (2006–08). He has also lectured at the Eastern University, Sri Lanka. In February 2008 he was appointed Auxiliary Bishop of Trincomalee-Batticaloa and was ordained as a bishop in May 2008. He was appointed Bishop of Batticaloa in July 2012.

References

External links
 

1952 births
Alumni of St. Joseph's College, Trincomalee
Alumni of the University of Jaffna
Alumni of the University of Peradeniya
Living people
People from Eastern Province, Sri Lanka
Pontifical Urban University alumni
Roman Catholic bishops of Batticaloa
Sri Lankan Tamil priests
Sri Lankan Roman Catholic bishops